Lina Polito (born 24 August 1954) is an Italian actress.

Born in Naples, Polito started her career on stage with Eduardo De Filippo. She made her film debut in 1973, with Lina Wertmüller's Love and Anarchy, and for this performance she was awarded with a Silver Ribbon for Best New Actress.

Her other film credits included roles in All Screwed Up (1974), Le farò da padre (1974), The Peaceful Age (1974), Salvo D'Acquisto (1975) and the nazisploitation  film Deported Women of the SS Special Section (1976). In 1975 she acted in the TV mini-series Il marsigliese by Giacomo Battiato.

In 1983 she won a David di Donatello for Best Supporting Actress for her performance in Massimo Troisi's Scusate il ritardo.

References

External links 
 

Italian film actresses
1954 births
Actresses from Naples
Italian television actresses
Italian stage actresses
Living people
David di Donatello winners
Nastro d'Argento winners
20th-century Italian actresses